The Bargo Railway Viaduct is a heritage-listed railway viaduct over the Bargo River located on the Main South railway approximately  from Central, in the south-western Sydney settlement of Bargo in the Wollondilly Shire local government area of New South Wales, Australia. The viaduct was designed by New South Wales Government Railways and built in 1919. It is also known as Bargo River Railway Viaduct. The property is owned by RailCorp, an agency of the Government of New South Wales. It was added to the New South Wales State Heritage Register on 2 April 1999.

History 
By the early 1900s much of the original single track railways in New South Wales had become inadequate for railway operations, particularly the busy Main Lines (South, West and North) through the Great Dividing Range. Plans were made to duplicate the tracks and at the same time ease the original steep grades and sharp curves, usually all achieved by deviation works.

It was a major programme beginning in 1910 and continuing to 1923. The dominant bridge building material was bricks, mostly from the 1912 State Brickworks at Homebush and mostly in the form of brick arches. This was due to (a) a general lack of expensive imported steel and (b) a long standing government policy to see local materials used as much as possible. Even for short spans, where a simple steel plate web girder would have been the norm, brick arches were built.

The quantity of bricks used in the programme was enormous so the period 1910-23 could be aptly described as the "era of brick arch construction". Thereafter, locally produced steel, from Newcastle and Port Kembla, displaced the use of bricks for superstructures, but large quantities of bricks continued to be used for piers, abutments and wings walls.

In the duplication programme, that of the Main South was the largest. For example the  first section from Picton to Bowral was one of the last completed in 1919 whereas the  section, Bowral to Goulburn, had been completed in 1915.

A design policy of the duplication work was to eliminate level crossings, consequently there are as many underbridges and overbridges for roads as there are underbridges for waterways. Fast, safe, through running was to be the new standard for goods and passenger trains.

Description 
A large brick arch viaduct consisting of five  spans over the Bargo River.

Condition 

As at 16 March 2006, the physical condition is good.

The bridge retains its original fabric and structure.

Heritage listing 
But this viaduct has a set of larger brick arches at  clear spans. The bridge retains its original fabric and structure.

Bargo Railway Viaduct was listed on the New South Wales State Heritage Register on 2 April 1999 having satisfied the following criteria.

The place is important in demonstrating the course, or pattern, of cultural or natural history in New South Wales.

The bridge is part of the major duplication of the Main South Railway.

The place is important in demonstrating aesthetic characteristics and/or a high degree of creative or technical achievement in New South Wales.

The bridge is readily accessible from the Old Hume Highway set in a natural environment.

The place has a strong or special association with a particular community or cultural group in New South Wales for social, cultural or spiritual reasons.

The duplication work contributed significantly to the continued development of South Western New South Wales, commercially through freight trains and socially through faster, better passenger trains.

The place has potential to yield information that will contribute to an understanding of the cultural or natural history of New South Wales.

These structures depend on the bricklayers skills.

The place is important in demonstrating the principal characteristics of a class of cultural or natural places/environments in New South Wales.

A good representative example of brick arch construction.

See also 

List of railway bridges in New South Wales

References

Bibliography

Attribution

External links

New South Wales State Heritage Register
Bargo, New South Wales
Railway bridges in New South Wales
Regional railway lines in New South Wales
Articles incorporating text from the New South Wales State Heritage Register
Arch bridges in Australia
Viaducts in Australia
1919 establishments in Australia
Bridges completed in 1919
Main Southern railway line, New South Wales